Mugal Chak  is a village in Kapurthala district of Punjab State, India. The village is administrated by a Sarpanch who is an elected representative of village as per the constitution of India and Panchayati raj (India).

Demography 
According to the report published by Census India in 2011, Mugal Chak has total number of 96 houses and population of 505 of which include 276 males and 229 females. Literacy rate of Mugal Chak is 79.57%, higher than state average of 75.84%.  The population of children under the age of 6 years is 45 which is 8.91% of total population of Mugal Chak, and child sex ratio is approximately 607, lower than state average of 846.

Population data

Air travel connectivity 
The closest airport to the village is Sri Guru Ram Dass Jee International Airport.

Villages in Kapurthala

References

External links
  Villages in Kapurthala
 Kapurthala Villages List

Villages in Kapurthala district